Suzzy Roche (born September 29, 1956) is an American singer and actress best known for her work with the vocal group The Roches, alongside sisters Maggie and Terre. Suzzy is the youngest of the three, and joined the act in 1977. She is the author of the novels Wayward Saints and The Town Crazy and the children's book Want To Be in a Band?

Early life 
Raised in Park Ridge, New Jersey, Suzzy began performing as a student at Park Ridge High School.

Career
Roche is an active associate member of The Wooster Group and has appeared in a number of the group's productions as well as composing original music for the group's performances. She was briefly a member of Four Bitchin' Babes, appearing on their album Some Assembly Required. In 2004 Roche appeared on Crash Test Dummies album Songs of the Unforgiven.

In addition to singing, Roche has also acted in film and television. She appeared in the 1988 romantic comedy Crossing Delancey, the 1982 film Soup for One, and the 2016 short film The Law of Averages, where she plays the lead role of a conflicted mother in rural Quebec following the loss of her own mother. Roche also appeared with her siblings (playing themselves) in the 1996 comedy A Weekend in the Country.

Personal life
With musician Loudon Wainwright III, Roche has a daughter: Lucy Wainwright Roche. Lucy's paternal half-siblings Rufus Wainwright and Martha Wainwright (Loudon Wainwright's children with his first wife, the singer-songwriter Kate McGarrigle) are also singer-songwriters.

Filmography

Film

Television

Solo discography
 Holy Smokes (Red House, 1997)
 Songs from an Unmarried Housewife and Mother, Greenwich Village, USA (Red House, 2000)

References

External links
 

1956 births
Living people
American people of Irish descent
American women singers
American folk singers
Park Ridge High School alumni
People from Park Ridge, New Jersey
Songwriters from New Jersey
Four Bitchin' Babes members
Wainwright family
McGarrigle-Wainwright-Roche family
Red House Records artists
429 Records artists
Warner Records artists
Columbia Records artists
MCA Records artists
21st-century American women